
Pruno, or prison wine, is an alcoholic beverage variously made from apples, oranges, fruit cocktail, fruit juices, hard candy, sugar, high fructose syrup, and possibly other ingredients, including crumbled bread. Bread is incorrectly thought to contain yeast for the pruno to ferment. Pruno originated in (and remains largely confined to) prisons, where it can be produced with the limited selection of equipment and ingredients available to inmates. The concoction can be made using only a plastic bag, hot running water, and a towel or sock to conceal the pulp during fermentation. The end result has been colorfully described as a "bile flavored wine-cooler". Depending on the time spent fermenting (always balanced against the risk of discovery by officers), the sugar content, and the quality of the ingredients and preparation, pruno's alcohol content by volume can range from as low as 2% (equivalent to a very weak beer) to as high as 14% (equivalent to a strong wine).

Description

Typically, the fermenting mass of fruit—called the motor or kicker in prison parlance—is retained from batch to batch to make the fermentation start faster. The more sugar that is added, the greater the potential for a higher alcohol content—to a point. Beyond this point, the waste products of fermentation (mainly alcohol) cause the motor to die or go dormant as the yeasts' environment becomes too poisoned for them to continue fermenting. This also causes the taste of the end product to suffer. Ascorbic acid powder is sometimes used to stop the fermentation at a certain point, which, combined with the tartness of the added acid, somewhat enhances the taste by reducing the cloyingly sweet flavor associated with pruno.

In 2004 and 2005 botulism outbreaks were reported among inmates in two California prisons; the Centers for Disease Control and Prevention suspects that potatoes used in making pruno were to blame in both cases. In 2012, similar botulism outbreaks caused by potato-based pruno were reported among inmates at prisons in Arizona and Utah.

Inmates are not permitted to have alcoholic beverages, and correctional officers confiscate pruno whenever and wherever they find it. In an effort to eradicate pruno, some wardens have gone as far as banning all fresh fruit, fruit juices, and fruit-based food products from prison cafeterias. But even this is not always enough; there are pruno varieties made almost entirely from sauerkraut and orange juice. Food hoarding in the inmate cells in both prisons and jails allows the inmates to acquire ingredients and produce pruno. During jail and prison inmate cell searches, correctional officers remove excessive or unauthorized food items to halt the production of pruno. Pruno is hidden under bunks, inside toilets, inside walls, trash cans, in the shower area and anywhere inmates feel is safe to brew their pruno away from the prying eyes of correctional officers and jailers.

Jarvis Jay Masters, a death row inmate at San Quentin, offers an oft-referenced recipe for pruno in his poem "Recipe for Prison Pruno", which won a PEN award in 1992.

Another recipe for pruno can be found in Michael Finkel's Esquire article on Oregon death row inmate Christian Longo.

In 2004 at the American Homebrewers Association's National Homebrew Conference in Las Vegas, a pruno competition and judging was held.

A variety of other prison-made alcoholic potables are known to exist. These include crude wines, famously fermented in toilet tanks. Sugary beverages like orange drink may also be fermented and distilled using a radiator or other available heat source. Though popularized in prison fiction, these techniques are slow and laborious, and generally result in a low alcohol content.

See also

 Bum wine
 Changaa
 Chicha
 Drinking culture
 Jenkem
 Kilju
 Kvas
 Moonshine (hooch)
 Pájaro verde
 Poitín
 Bootlegging
 Tepache
 Tharra
 White Lightning

References

External links
 "Jailhouse Hooch: How to Get Liquored Up While Locked Down" from Modern Drunkard Magazine
 Blacktable.com —a complete pruno recipe, including detailed instructions and frequent disclaimers.
 "Steve Don't Eat It, Vol. 8: Prison Wine"—extensive, humorous account of pruno preparation and tasting, with photographs, from The Sneeze.
 "How to Make Pruno: 8 steps"—on wikiHow
 "Jailhouse Pruno -- Homemade Booze: It'll Kill You"—story about pruno-making methods, pruno stashing, and the cost of pruno in Sacramento, California's New Folsom prison circa 1995.

Fermented drinks
Prison-related crime
Prison drinks

ru:Брага